Moelv, Moelven, or Moelva may refer to:

Places
Moelv, a town in Ringsaker Municipality in Innlandet county, Norway
Moelv Station, a railway station in the town of Moelv in Ringsaker Municipality in Innlandet county, Norway
Moelva (Ringsaker), a river in Ringsaker Municipality in Innlandet county, Norway
Moelva (Agder), a river in Birkenes and Lillesand municipalities in Agder county, Norway

Other
Moelven Industrier, a Norwegian company
Moelven IL, a sports club in Ringsaker Municipality in Innlandet county, Norway

See also
Moälven, a river in Sweden